Star in the Hood EP Vol. 2 is the third extended play (EP) by recording artist Tinchy Stryder. It was released in July 2009 by Takeover Entertainment prior to the release of Stryder's second solo studio album, Catch 22, which was released on 17 August 2009. The EP is the second of a two-part free downloadable EP. Its cover art is a photo with a tribute to Michael Jackson and was made during the Catch 22 promo shoot.

Track listing

References

External links
 Tinchy Stryder - Star In The Hood EP Vol. 2. Grimepedia. 

2009 EPs
Tinchy Stryder albums
Takeover Entertainment EPs